Reflections is a Canadian classical music television series which aired on CBC Television in 1962.

Premise
This Halifax-produced series featured song standards and informally presented classical music. During the series run, arrangements were provided by musicians such as Lucio Agostini, and Ed McCurdy was among the various guests. The series orchestra was led by conductor and arranger Gordon MacPherson from the Maritime Conservatory of Music.

Reflections was adapted from Souvenirs, a local 15-minute series was produced at CBC Halifax Studios in Halifax, Nova Scotia.

Scheduling
This half-hour series was broadcast as follows (times in Eastern):

References

External links
 

CBC Television original programming
Television shows filmed in Halifax, Nova Scotia
1962 Canadian television series debuts
1962 Canadian television series endings